Gibbons Hall is a female dormitory for 138 upper-class students and one of 10 housing options for students at The Catholic University of America.  Constructed in 1911 and named for the university's first chancellor, Cardinal James Gibbons, it was renovated in 2009.  It is marked by a large central tower.

References

External links 
Official webpage

Buildings and structures completed in 1911
Residence halls of the Catholic University of America